Cyril Kamar (born January 31, 1980, in Beirut), known by his stage name K.Maro (sometimes stylized as K-Maro or K'Maro) is a Canadian pop singer-songwriter, producer and businessman of Lebanese origin. He sings in French and English. He is also the founder, the owner, and the CEO of East 47th Music, a record label, and Rock&Cherries Agency, a Paris-based Talents management agency. Both East 47th Music and Rock&Cherries Agency are part of KEG company (Kamar Entertainment Group).

Biography
Cyril Kamar is a francophone and anglophone singer, producer and businessman living between Paris, France and New York City. Cyril Kamar was born in Beirut, Lebanon on January 31, 1980. After the end of the war, he moved with his family to Montreal, Quebec, in 1991.

Music career 
K.Maro first broke through to the Quebec charts with his group LMDS, an abbreviation for "Les Messagers du Son". This was a French language hip hop duo in Montreal, Quebec, Canada formed in 1993 and made up of Cyril Kamar, called Lyrik, and Adil Takhssait, called Mélo in the duo.

The band achieved great success in Quebec and launched two successful albums, Les Messagers du Son in 1997 and Il Faudrait Leur Dire in 1999. LMDS broke up in 2001. Both artists continued their musical careers, Cyril Kamar (Lyrik) as K.Maro and Adil Takhssait (Mélo) as Vaï.

Solo career
After the breakup of LMDS, Cyril Kamar became successful as a solo artist, taking the name K.Maro (alternatives K'Maro and K-Maro). As a hip hop and R&B singer-songwriter and producer, he became an instant international success particularly with his first major hit, "Femme Like U" in 2004, from the album La Good Life. "Femme Like U" was number-one single in 17 countries and Platinum certified, more than two million copies of the song were sold and more than a million copies of La Good Life album were sold.

In 2005, K.Maro released his third album Million Dollar Boy. Subject to commercial success, the album became certified Platinum.

To celebrate his decade-long music career, K.Maro released in 2006, Platinum Remixes album.

K.Maro released his four album in 2008, Perfect Stranger, his first all-English album.

His songs are frequently a mix of French and English lyrics, and sometimes Arabic.

Business career 
In 2003, Cyril Kamar also established K.Pone Inc Music Group entertainment company, the K.Pone Inc. record label, and the Balbec line of clothing.

In 2010, Cyril Kamar joined Warner Music France as CEO of Ambitious Boys Club label record.

In 2013, he developed other ventures, including East 47th Music label record with Pascal Nègre and Universal Music Group.

Collaborations 
In addition to his solo career, K.Maro has collaborated with a number of artists, including:

Many collaborations with DJ Shortcut, notably in Fresh, which also featured Moshine. Another collaboration with DJ Shortcut and Moshine was in On est là.
He was featured in Chance of The 411, version exclusively available on the French edition of Between the Sheets.
He was featured in Le clan chill of Corneille.
He was also featured in Nos couleurs of Cheb Mami.
He featured Shy'm in his own single Histoires de Luv.
Has written a lot of material for Shy'm's debut album Mes Fantaisies, and was featured in À l'abri in the second album of Shy'm, Reflets.
He collaborated with Belly and Rad in Change The Game.
His song "Love It or Leave It" features Imposs.
His song "Out in the Streets Remix" features Jim Jones.
His song "Never Walk Away" features Odessa Thornhill.
His song "Take You Away (Part 2)" features the Canadian rock singer Jonas Tomalty.
He produced the 2013 version of Indonesian singer Anggun's hit "Snow on the Sahara" for her album, Best-Of: Design of a Decade 2003–2013.

Personal life 
Since July 2016, Cyril Kamar is married to the French brand and creative consultant Anne-Sophie Mignaux, former Jewelry, Watch and Arts editor in chief at CR Fashion Book (Carine Roitfeld's magazine) and Citizen K Magazine.

K.Pone.Inc

K.Maro also runs the K.Pone.Inc. Music Group, an entertainment group that goes into music production, promotion and distribution. K-Pone Inc.'s label, K.Pone Inc., has signed many artists, including:
Shy'm (Tamara Marthe)
Imposs (S. Rimsky Salgado)
Ale Dee (Alexandre Duhaime)
Vaï (Adil Takhssait)

Balbec
Balbec is K.Maro's upmarket clothing line. It is named after his hometown Baalbek in Lebanon.

Discography

Albums 

Chart positions:

Singles / Videos 

Chart positions:

Non-charting singles / videos
 2006: "Gangsta Party"
 2006: "Let's go"
 2008: "Out in the Streets"
 2008: "Take You Away"
 2009: "Out In The Streets" (remix) (feat. Jim Jones)
 2009: "Elektric"
 2009: "Music"

Awards
In November 2006, K-Maro won The International Achievement Award at the 17th Gala of the Society of Composers, Authors and Music Publishers of Canada.
In 2008, K-Maro won the International Achievement Award at the Francophone SOCAN Awards in Montreal.

References

External links 
 K.Maro Official site
 K.Maro Official Myspace site
 K.Maro TV Official site
 Balbec K.Maro's fashion clothing line
 K.Pone Inc label site
 K.Pone Inc YouTube site

1980 births
Living people
Canadian male rappers
20th-century Canadian rappers
Canadian rhythm and blues musicians
Lebanese emigrants to Canada
Musicians from Beirut
21st-century Canadian rappers
20th-century Canadian male musicians
21st-century Canadian male musicians